Steven Francis Andrako (originally Andrejko) (September 11, 1915 – November 1980) was an American football offensive lineman in the National Football League for the Washington Redskins.  He played college football for the Ohio State Buckeyes and was drafted in the seventeenth round of the 1940 NFL Draft.

References

1915 births
1980 deaths
American football centers
Ohio State Buckeyes football players
People from Braddock, Pennsylvania
Players of American football from Pennsylvania
Sportspeople from the Pittsburgh metropolitan area
Washington Redskins players